Innocents of Paris is a 1929 black and white American musical film. Directed by Richard Wallace and is based on the play Flea Market, the film was the first musical production by Paramount Pictures. Although the screenplay was regarded as mediocre, the critics were impressed with the newly-arrived Chevalier, for whom they predicted much success. At the preview in Los Angeles, established film-actor Adolphe Menjou, son of French immigrant parents,congratulated Chevalier in person.

The film utilized the somewhat new technology of sound. Dubbing was not a common practice, but the film makers attempted it here over stock footage of Paris. An orchestra played "Louise" under one microphone while several actors spoke street observations under another, like "What pretty flowers!", and a group of three men whistled bird calls into a third microphone. Several takes were required to get the mixing right, but what resulted was an early example of sound dubbing.

Cast
Maurice Chevalier as Maurice Marney
Sylvia Beecher as Louise Leval
Russell Simpson as Emile Leval
George Fawcett as Monsieur Marny
 Mrs. George Fawcett (Percy Haswell) as Madame Marny
John Miljan as  Monsieur Renard
Margaret Livingston as Madame Renard
Jack Luden as Jules
Johnnie Morris as Musician

Soundtrack
"It's A Habit Of Mine"
Words by Leo Robin
Music by Richard A. Whiting
Copyright 1929 by Famous Music Corp.
"Wait 'Til You See Ma Cherie"
Words by Leo Robin
Music by Richard A. Whiting
Copyright 1929 by Famous Music Corp.
"On Top Of The World, Alone"
Words by Leo Robin
Music by Richard A. Whiting
Copyright 1929 by Famous Music Corp.
"Louise"
Words by Leo Robin
Music by Richard A. Whiting
Sung by Maurice Chevalier
Copyright 1929 by Famous Music Corp.

References
 protest the hero's new song: The Duelling Cavalier

External links

Innocents of Paris at The New York Times
Innocents of Paris at OVGuide
Innocents of Paris

Innocents of Paris at The Sydney Morning Herald

1929 films
1929 musical films
Films directed by Richard Wallace
American black-and-white films
American musical films
Paramount Pictures films
Films set in Paris
Films scored by John Leipold
1920s English-language films
1920s American films